Crossodactylus is a genus of frogs in the family Hylodidae. The genus occurs in Brazil, southern Paraguay, and northern Argentina. These frogs are sometimes known as Limnocharis, Tarsopterus, Calamobates, and spinythumb frogs. They typically inhabit streams in mountainous areas in the Atlantic Forest or in montane savanna.

Species
There are 14 species:

References

Hylodidae
 
Amphibians of South America
Amphibian genera
Taxa named by André Marie Constant Duméril
Taxa named by Gabriel Bibron
Taxonomy articles created by Polbot